Kyoragi Dam  is a rockfill dam located in Kumamoto Prefecture in Japan. The dam is used for irrigation and water supply. The catchment area of the dam is 3.1 km2. The dam impounds about 18  ha of land when full and can store 1391 thousand cubic meters of water. The construction of the dam was started on 1972 and completed in 1976.

See also
List of dams in Japan

References

Dams in Kumamoto Prefecture